Kortavij-e Olya (also Romanized as Kortavīj-e ‘Olyā and Kort Vīj-e ‘Olyā; also known as Gortavīch-e ‘Olyā, Kortavīj-e Bālā, Kurtai, and Kurtai Bālā) is a village in Kanduleh Rural District, Dinavar District, Sahneh County, Kermanshah Province, Iran. At the 2006 census, its population was 295, in 72 families.

References 

Populated places in Sahneh County